Albert Kapsky (born 18 January 1997) is a Belarusian professional footballer who plays for Volna Pinsk.

References

External links 
 
 Profile at FC Minsk website 
 

1997 births
Living people
Footballers from Minsk
Belarusian footballers
Association football defenders
FC Minsk players
FC Luch Minsk (2012) players
FC Smorgon players
FC Naftan Novopolotsk players
FC Arsenal Dzerzhinsk players
FC Volna Pinsk players